Sandra Walsham Reid is an Australian former professional tennis player.

Walsham was a women's doubles semi-finalist at the 1967 Australian Championships and qualified for the singles main draw of the 1970 Wimbledon Championships. She took over the Matraville Sports Centre with husband Bob Reid in 1988. Their children, Renee Reid and Todd Reid, were both professional tennis players.

References

External links
 
 

Year of birth missing (living people)
Living people
Australian female tennis players